Wolkowo may refer to the following places in Poland:
Wolkowo, Grodzisk Wielkopolski County, Greater Poland Voivodeship (west-central Poland)
Wolkowo, Leszno County, Greater Poland Voivodeship (west-central Poland)
Wołkowo, West Pomeranian Voivodeship (north-west Poland)